Events from the year 1825 in France.

Incumbents
 Monarch – Charles X
 Prime Minister – Joseph de Villèle

Events
January - Anti-Sacrilege Act, law against blasphemy and sacrilege passed under King Charles X. The law is never applied (except for a minor point).
17 April - Charles X recognizes Haiti, 21 years after it expelled the French after the successful Haitian Revolution.
Franco-Trarzan War of 1825, conflict between the forces of the new amir of Trarza, Muhammad al Habib, and France.
Canal Saint-Martin opened in Paris.

Births

January to June
28 February - Jean-Baptiste Arban, cornetist and conductor (died 1889)
16 March - Auguste Poulet-Malassis, printer and publisher (died 1878)
6 May - Charlotte de Rothschild, socialite and painter (died 1899)
7 June - Gustave Emile Boissonade, legal scholar (died 1910)
14 June - Jean-Baptiste Joseph Émile Montégut, critic (died 1895)
30 June - Hervé, composer, librettist and conductor (died 1892)

July to December
2 July - Émile Ollivier, statesman, 30th Prime Minister of France (died 1913)
19 July - Pierre Potain, cardiologist (died 1901)
4 August - Victor Auguste, baron Duperré, colonial administrator (died 1900)
22 August - Auguste Arnaud, sculptor (died 1883)
17 October - Louis Joseph Troost, chemist (died 1911)
31 October - Charles Lavigerie, Cardinal, Primate of Africa (died 1892)
6 November - Charles Garnier, architect (died 1898)
29 November - Jean-Martin Charcot, neurologist and professor of anatomical pathology (died 1893)
30 November - William-Adolphe Bouguereau, painter (died 1905)
25 December - Henri de Bornier, poet and dramatist (died 1901)

Full date unknown
Joseph-Epiphane Darras, historian (died 1878)
Armand Gautier, painter and lithographer (died 1894)

Deaths

January to June
17 January - Antoine-François-Claude Ferrand, statesman and political writer (born 1751)
5 February - Pierre Gaveaux, operatic tenor and composer (born 1761)
17 February - Jean-Baptiste Robert Lindet, politician (born 1746)
25 March - Fabre d'Olivet, author, poet and composer (born 1767)
19 May - Claude Henri de Rouvroy, comte de Saint-Simon, utopian socialist thinker (born 1760)
21 May - André Briche, General (born 1772)
9 June - Pauline Bonaparte, younger and favourite sister of Napoleon I of France (born 1780)

July to December
26 September - Guillaume-André-Réné Baston, theologian (born 1741)
28 November - Maximilien Sebastien Foy, military leader, statesman and writer (born 1775)
3 December - Adélaïde Dufrénoy, poet and painter (born 1765)
5 December - Antoine Alexandre Barbier, librarian and bibliographer (born 1765)
29 December - Jacques-Louis David, painter (born 1748)

Full date unknown
Guillaume de Bonne-Carrere, diplomat (born 1754)
Raphaël, Comte de Casabianca, General (born 1738)

See also

References

1820s in France